Don Lucio y el hermano pío ("Don Lucio and the pious brother") is a 1960 Spanish comedy film directed by José Antonio Nieves Conde, starring Tony Leblanc and José Isbert. It tells the story of a swindler who becomes aquinted with a monk during a train ride to Madrid. Leblanc received the Best Actor award from the National Syndicate of Spectacle.

Cast
 Tony Leblanc as Lucio García / Falso Hermano Antón
 José Isbert as Hermano Pío
 Montserrat Salvador as Mari
 Tony Soler as Remedios
 Pedro Porcel as Señor Rivera
 Ana María Custodio as Doña Lola
 Gracita Morales as Gracita
 Lidia San Clemente as Sole

References

1960 films
1960 comedy films
Films directed by José Antonio Nieves Conde
Spanish comedy films
1960s Spanish-language films
1960s Spanish films